The Farmall F-30 is a large three-plow row crop tractor produced by International Harvester under the Farmall brand from 1931 to 1939, with approximately 28,900 produced. It was a larger successor to the Farmall Regular, and was replaced in 1939 by the Farmall M as the largest tractor in the Farmall line.

Description and production
The F-30 was a modernization of the earlier Farmall Regular, with the capabilities of the International Harvester . The F-30 name implied that the machine could pull three plows. Versions were available for gasoline, distillate and kerosene fuels. The rear portal axle used drop gears to raise the clearance underneath the tractor higher than a simple axle would allow. A wide front axle was available as an option. The first tractors were delivered with steel wheels, with pneumatic tires being offered in 1933. Early-year F-30s were painted gray, like the Regular. Beginning in 1936 the F-30 was painted bright red, to increase visibility; this quickly became a trademark of the Farmall line. About 28,900 were produced during the product run. Purchase prices were between $1,100 and $1,300.

Variants
The standard-tread tractor version of the F-30 was the International W-40, a predecessor to the McCormick-Deering W-6. The standard tractor was meant for work not involving row crops, and had wide front wheels, a lower profile, and smaller rear wheels. A version of the F-30 with a narrow rear wheelset and wide front wheels was produced for sugar cane cultivation, known as the F-30 Cane Special.

Comparable product
The Oliver 18/27 was a comparable product offered by the Oliver Farm Equipment Company.

References

External links
NTTL Test #198 - Farmall F-30 at the Nebraska Tractor Test Laboratory archive

Farmall tractors
Vehicles introduced in 1931